Sportpark Koninklijke HFC is a cricket ground in Haarlem, the Netherlands.  The first recorded match on the ground came in 1895 when the Haarlem played English club Leicester Ivanhoe.  The ground has a long association of holding touring English sides, with the Free Foresters regular visitors, along with other touring English county sides, though none of these matches were rated as first-class.  The ground later held seven matches in the ICC Trophy.  Between 1984 and 2003 ten Women's One Day Internationals were played on the ground.

The ground is used by Rood en Wit Cricket Club.

References

External links:@ShamiHuawei1980 Ajax Amsterdam Arena 
Sportpark Koninklijke HFC at ESPNcricinfo
Sportpark Koninklijke HFC at CricketArchive

 

Cricket grounds in the Netherlands
Sports venues in North Holland
Buildings and structures in Haarlem
Sport in Haarlem